Abdollah Riazi was an Iranian politician who served as the Speaker of the Parliament of Iran for almost 15 years during Pahlavi dynasty.

According to Ali Rahnema, Riazi was "one of permanent and trusted figures" in the establishment, thus "experienced and adept at political correctness". Fakhreddin Azimi describes Riazi as having an "unquestioning deference toward the Shah", which "contrasted sharply with his disdainful attitude toward the deputies, whom he treated virtually as schoolchildren".

Parliamentary career 
In 1963, Abdollah Riazi became a candidate for the 21st Parliament and was elected as the top deputy from Tehran.

He was then elected as member of the executive committee and Speaker of the Majles (Parliament or Congress) for the first time.

He remained Speaker of the Parliament in the 22nd and 23rd term, for three consecutive full four year terms or 12 years.  In the 24th term he served as Speaker in the beginning of the term, but was succeeded by Javad Saeed.

Death 
Following the Iranian Revolution, he was arrested and faced three charges in the Islamic Revolutionary Court, including "corruption on earth", "collaborating with the omted regime and trying to re-establish the Shah's idolatrous rule over the weak and defenceless people" and "treason"; eventually leading to execution.

References 

1905 births
1979 deaths
Speakers of the National Consultative Assembly
Academic staff of the University of Tehran
Rastakhiz Party politicians
Iran Novin Party politicians
People executed by Iran by firing squad
People executed for treason against Iran
Politicians executed during the Iranian Revolution
20th-century Iranian mathematicians
Members of the 21st Iranian Majlis
Members of the 22nd Iranian Majlis
Members of the 23rd Iranian Majlis
Members of the 24th Iranian Majlis
Politicians from Isfahan